The 2013 Premier League Asia Trophy was the sixth edition of the Premier League Asia Trophy. Sunderland, Manchester City, Tottenham Hotspur and Hong Kong club South China competed for the title on 24 July 2013 and 27 July 2013 at Hong Kong Stadium in So Kon Po, Hong Kong. Manchester City were the winners, beating Sunderland 1–0 in the final.

The tournament was also notable for the absence of Tottenham Hotspur's star Gareth Bale.  Bale travelled with Spurs to Hong Kong, but an injury he suffered in training meant he did not play in either of Tottenham's matches.

Furthermore, the tournament was also notable for the very poor quality of the grass on the pitch at the venue.

Participating Teams

Results 
{{Round4-with third

|24 July – Hong Kong| Manchester City| 1 | South China | 0 
|24 July – Hong Kong| Tottenham Hotspur| 1 |  Sunderland| 3

|27 July – Hong Kong| Manchester City| 1 | Sunderland| 0

|27 July – Hong Kong|| 6' | South China| 0
}}

 Semifinals All kick-off times are local (UTC+08:00).Delayed by 30 minutes due to rain. Game reduced to 80 minutes (40-minute halves).Delayed by 10 minutes due to rain. Game reduced to 80 minutes (40-minute halves).''

Third-place playoff

Final

Goalscorers

3 goals

 Jermain Defoe

2 goals

 Edin Džeko

1 goal

 Cabral
 Wes Brown
 Andros Townsend
 Gylfi Sigurðsson
 David Moberg Karlsson
 Clint Dempsey

1 own goal

 Sean Tse

References 

 Premier League Asia Trophy
Premier
2013
Asia Trophy